OpenPDF is a free Java library for creating and editing PDF files with the Mozilla Public License and the GNU Library General Public License free software license. It is a fork of iText, created because the license of iText was changed from LGPL / MPL to a dual AGPL and proprietary license in order for the original authors to sell a proprietary version of the software. Version 1.3.30 was released September 19, 2022.

See also 

 List of PDF software

References

External links 
 

Free PDF software
Free typesetting software
Free software programmed in Java (programming language)
Java platform
Java (programming language) libraries